The anterior commissure (also known as the precommissure) is a white matter tract (a bundle of axons) connecting the two temporal lobes of the cerebral hemispheres across the midline, and placed in front of the columns of the fornix. In most existing mammals, the great majority of fibers connecting the two hemispheres travel through the corpus callosum, which is over 10 times larger than the anterior commissure, and other routes of communication pass through the hippocampal commissure or, indirectly, via subcortical connections.  Nevertheless, the anterior commissure is a significant pathway that can be clearly distinguished in the brains of all mammals.

The anterior commissure plays a key role in pain sensation, more specifically sharp, acute pain.  It also contains decussating fibers from the olfactory tracts, vital for the sense of smell and chemoreception.  The anterior commissure works with the posterior commissure to link the two cerebral hemispheres of the brain and also interconnects the amygdalae and temporal lobes, contributing to the role of memory, emotion, speech and hearing.  It also is involved in olfaction, instinct, and sexual behavior.

In a sagittal section, the anterior commissure is oval in shape, having a long vertical axis that measures about 5 mm.

Structure
The fibers of the anterior commissure can be traced laterally and posteriorly on either side beneath the striatum into the substance of the temporal lobe.

It serves in this way to connect the two temporal lobes, but it also contains decussating fibers from the olfactory tracts, and is a part of the neospinothalamic tract for pain.  The anterior commissure also serves to connect the two amygdalae.

The corpus callosum allows for communication between the two hemispheres and is found only in placental mammals (the eutherians), while it is absent in monotremes and marsupials, as well as other vertebrates such as birds, reptiles, amphibians and fish. The anterior commissure  serves as the primary mode of interhemispheric communication in marsupials, and which carries all the commissural fibers arising from the neocortex (also known as the neopallium), whereas in placental mammals the anterior commissure carries only some of these fibers).

Function

The functionality of the anterior commissure is still not completely understood. Researchers have implicated it in functions ranging from colour perception to attention. One such study supported colour perception in callosal agenesis (Those born without a corpus callosum; Barr & Corballis, 2002). Other studies have built on this to imply that the anterior commissure can be a compensatory pathway in those without a corpus callosum, presenting diffusion tensor imaging (DTI) techniques to better elucidate the anterior commissure and how it might be implicated in various functions (Winter & Franz, 2014).

Sexuality
In 1992 Laura Allen and Roger Gorski of UCLA measured the anterior commissures of 30 homosexual men, 30 heterosexual men, and 30 heterosexual women.   They found that all three groups' commissures were significantly different from one another, with homosexual males having the largest anterior commissure, followed by heterosexual women, and then heterosexual men, who had the smallest anterior commissures.

In 1993, a review by Byne and Parsons criticized this research, noting that 27 of the 33 homosexual males fell within the range of heterosexual males in the study.
However, because range is defined only by the two most extreme data points in a group, the existence of a single heterosexual male with an exceptionally large anterior commissure for his group (an outlier) would cause this large range irrespective of the data from the rest of the individuals in the group.   This individual's existence would not change the fact that the groups on average were quite different from one another, and that these differences were statistically significant.

A later report by Byne et al. (2001) noted that We also measured the anterior commissure in the same blocks of tissue used for the present hypothalamic study (data not shown) and were unable to replicate a report [by Allen and Gorski] that its cross-sectional area is larger in women than in men.
Also, a study by Lasco et al. (2002) said:We examined the cross-sectional area of the AC in postmortem material from 120 individuals, and found no variation in the size of the AC with age, HIV status, sex, or sexual orientation.

Gallery

See also
 Posterior commissure
 Corpus callosum

References

External links

 Overview at University of Cambridge
 
 https://web.archive.org/web/20070512234725/http://www2.umdnj.edu/~neuro/studyaid/Practical2000/Q09.htm
 
 NIF Search - Anterior Commissure via the Neuroscience Information Framework

Cerebrum